Manebhanjyang may refer:

Manebhanjyang, Bhojpur, a village in Bhojpur District, Nepal
Manebhanjyang, Sankhuwasabha, a village in Sankhuwasabha District, Nepal
Manebhanjyang Rural Municipality, a rural municipality in Okhaldhunga District, Nepal
Manebhanjyang, Darjeeling, a town in Darjeeling District, India